Raymond Anthony "Ray" Borg  (born August 4, 1993), is an American mixed martial artist who currently competes in the Bantamweight division of Bellator MMA. A professional MMA competitor since 2012, Borg is best known for his 12–fight tenure in the Ultimate Fighting Championship where he competed primarily in the Flyweight division. Before that, he made a name for himself fighting mostly in his native Southwestern United States, competing in promotions like King of the Cage and Legacy Fighting Championship.

Mixed martial arts career

Ultimate Fighting Championship
After a successful career in United States, with an undefeated 6–0 mixed martial arts record, it was revealed in April 2014, that Borg had signed with the UFC.

Borg made his UFC debut against Dustin Ortiz on April 19, 2014, at UFC on Fox: Werdum vs. Browne. He lost the fight via split decision.

Borg was scheduled to face Ryan Benoit, at UFC Fight Night: Swanson vs. Stephens. However, due to an injury, Benoit was replaced by promotional newcomer Shane Howell. Borg won the fight via submission (rear-naked choke) in the first round. The win also won Borg his first Performance of the Night bonus award.

Borg was briefly linked to a potential fight against Richie Vaculik on November 8, 2014, at UFC Fight Night 55. However, Borg was forced to pull out of the event due to injury and was replaced by Neil Seery. Subsequently, Seery pulled out of that bout as well and was replaced by Louis Smolka.

Borg faced Chris Kelades on February 14, 2015, at UFC Fight Night 60. Borg won the one sided fight via submission in the third round, earning him his second consecutive Performance of the Night award.

Borg faced promotional newcomer Geane Herrera on August 8, 2015, at UFC Fight Night 73. He won the fight by unanimous decision.

Borg faced Justin Scoggins on February 6, 2016, at UFC Fight Night 82. He lost the fight via unanimous decision.

Borg was expected to face Fredy Serrano on July 30, 2016, at UFC 201. However, Borg pulled out on July 21 due to injury and was replaced by Ryan Benoit.

Following a quick recovery, Borg was quickly rescheduled and was expected to face Ian McCall on September 10, 2016, at UFC 203. However, Borg pulled out of the fight on September 7 citing an illness. With no time to find a suitable replacement, McCall was removed from the card.

Borg next faced Louis Smolka on December 30, 2016, at UFC 207. At the weigh-ins, Borg missed weight for the bout, coming in at 129.5 pounds. As a result, he was fined 30% of his fight purse, which went to Smolka, who agreed to take a catchweight bout. Borg won the fight by unanimous decision.

Borg faced Jussier Formiga on March 11, 2017, at UFC Fight Night 106. He won the fight via unanimous decision.

Borg was expected to face then champion Demetrious Johnson on September 9, 2017, at UFC 215 for the UFC Flyweight Championship. In turn, the fight was canceled a day before the event, as Borg was forced to withdraw from the fight on Thursday evening due to illness. According to multiple sources, Borg has been battling an illness this week and was deemed unfit to fight by UFC doctors. The bout was quickly rescheduled and took place the following month at UFC 216. Borg lost the bout via suplex to armbar in the fifth round.

Borg was expected to face Brandon Moreno on April 7, 2018, at UFC 223, but was removed from the card after being injured by glass from a bus window that was smashed by Conor McGregor and his entourage. The pairing was left intact and quickly rescheduled and was expected to take place on May 19, 2018, at UFC Fight Night 129. However, in late April, Borg withdrew from the bout to take care of his child from brain surgery.

Borg was expected to face Joseph Benavidez on November 10, 2018, at UFC Fight Night 139. However on November 7, 2018 it was reported that the bout was cancelled due to undisclosed medical issues for Borg.

Borg was expected to face Pingyuan Liu in a bantamweight bout on March 30, 2019 at UFC on ESPN 2. However, it was reported on March 13, that Liu was replaced by newcomer Kyler Phillips for an undisclosed reason. In turn, Phillips was removed from the card on March 25 for undisclosed reasons and replaced by Casey Kenney. At the weigh-ins, Borg weighed in at 137.75 lbs, 1.75 pound over the bantamweight non-title fight limit of 136 lbs. He was fined 20% of his fight purse and his bout against Kenney proceeded at catchweight. Borg would go on to lose the fight by a controversial unanimous decision.

Borg faced Gabriel Silva on July 20, 2019 at UFC on ESPN 4.  He won the fight via unanimous decision.

Borg faced Rogério Bontorin on February 15, 2020 at UFC Fight Night: Anderson vs. Błachowicz 2. At the weigh-ins on February 14, Borg missed weight for the bout, weighing in at 128 pounds, 2 pounds over the non-title flyweight limit of 126 pounds. The bout proceeded at a catchweight and Borg forfeited 20% of his purse and he was not eligible for any post-fight bonus awards. This marked the fourth time in Borg's career that he has missed weight. Borg won the fight by unanimous decision.

Borg faced Ricky Simón on May 13, 2020 at UFC Fight Night: Smith vs. Teixeira. He lost the fight via split decision.

Borg was scheduled to face Merab Dvalishvili on June 13, 2020 at UFC on ESPN: Eye vs. Calvillo. However, Borg withdrew from the event for personal reasons and was replaced by promotional newcomer Gustavo Lopez. The bout instead took place at a catchweight of 140 pounds.

Borg was scheduled to face Nate Maness on August 1, 2020 at UFC Fight Night: Brunson vs. Shahbazyan. However, Borg was removed from the fight on the day of the event's weigh-in for undisclosed reasons. Maness went on to face Johnny Muñoz in a featherweight bout. Borg was subsequently released from the UFC.

Post UFC 
Borg made his return against Jesse Arnett at UAE Warriors on June 19, 2021. He won the bout via unanimous decision.

Borg was then scheduled to challenge Vinicius de Oliveira for the UAE Warriors Bantamweight Championship at UAE Warriors 23 on October 29, 2021. However, Borg withdrew from the bout after contracting with COVID-19 and was replaced by Sylvester Chipfumbu.

Borg faced Cody Gibson on January 28, 2022 at Eagle FC 44: Spong vs. Kharitonov. He won the bout via unanimous decision.

Borg faced Ricky Bandejas at Eagle FC 46 on March 11, 2022. He won the close bout via split decision.

Bellator MMA 
On February 21, 2023, it was announced that Borg had signed with Bellator MMA.

Borg is scheduled to make his promotional debut moving down to Flyweight to face Kyoji Horiguchi on April 22, 2023 at Bellator 295.

Personal life
Borg and his wife Amanda have a son, Anthony, who was born with hydrocephalus in 2018. Borg is also the legal guardian of his niece.

Championships and accomplishments

Mixed martial arts
Ultimate Fighting Championship
Performance of the Night (Two times) vs. Chris Kelades and Shane Howell.

Mixed martial arts record

|-
| Win
| align=center|16–5
| Ricky Bandejas
| Decision (split)
| Eagle FC 46
| 
| align=center|3
| align=center|5:00
| Miami, Florida, United States
| 
|-
|Win
|align=center|15–5
|Cody Gibson
|Decision (unanimous)
|Eagle FC 44
|
|align=center|3
|align=center|5:00
|Miami, Florida, United States
|
|-
|Win
|align=center|14–5
|Jesse Arnett
|Decision (unanimous)
|UAE Warriors 20
|
|align=center|3
|align=center|5:00
|Abu Dhabi, United Arab Emirates
|
|-
|Loss
|align=center|13–5
|Ricky Simón
|Decision (split)
|UFC Fight Night: Smith vs. Teixeira
|
|align=center|3
|align=center|5:00
|Jacksonville, Florida, United States
|
|-
|Win
|align=center|13–4
|Rogério Bontorin
|Decision (unanimous)
|UFC Fight Night: Anderson vs. Błachowicz 2 
|
|align=center|3
|align=center|5:00
|Rio Rancho, New Mexico, United States
|
|-
|Win
|align=center|12–4
|Gabriel Silva
|Decision (unanimous)
|UFC on ESPN: dos Anjos vs. Edwards 
|
|align=center|3
|align=center|5:00
|San Antonio, Texas, United States
|
|-
|Loss
|align=center|11–4
|Casey Kenney
| Decision (unanimous)
|UFC on ESPN: Barboza vs. Gaethje 
|
|align=center|3
|align=center|5:00
|Philadelphia, Pennsylvania, United States
|
|-
|Loss
|align=center|11–3
|Demetrious Johnson
|Submission (flying armbar)
|UFC 216
|
|align=center|5
|align=center|3:15
|Las Vegas, Nevada, United States
|
|-
|Win
|align=center|11–2
|Jussier Formiga
|Decision (unanimous)
|UFC Fight Night: Belfort vs. Gastelum
|
|align=center|3
|align=center|5:00
|Fortaleza, Brazil
|
|-
|Win
|align=center|10–2
|Louis Smolka
|Decision (unanimous)
|UFC 207
|
|align=center|3
|align=center|5:00
|Las Vegas, Nevada, United States
|
|-
|Loss
|align=center|9–2
|Justin Scoggins
|Decision (unanimous)
|UFC Fight Night: Hendricks vs. Thompson
|
|align=center|3
|align=center|5:00
|Las Vegas, Nevada, United States
|
|-
|Win
|align=center|9–1
|Geane Herrera
|Decision (unanimous)
|UFC Fight Night: Teixeira vs. Saint Preux
|
|align=center|3
|align=center|5:00
|Nashville, Tennessee, United States
|
|-
|Win
|align=center|8–1
|Chris Kelades
|Submission (kimura)
|UFC Fight Night: Henderson vs. Thatch
|
|align=center|3
|align=center|2:56
|Broomfield, Colorado, United States
|
|-
|Win
|align=center|7–1
|Shane Howell
|Technical Submission (rear-naked choke)
|UFC Fight Night: Swanson vs. Stephens
|
|align=center|1
|align=center|2:17
|San Antonio, Texas, United States
|
|-
|Loss
|align=center|6–1
|Dustin Ortiz
|Decision (split)
|UFC on Fox: Werdum vs. Browne
|
|align=center|3
|align=center|5:00
|Orlando, Florida, United States
|
|-
|Win
|align=center|6–0
|Nick Urso
|Submission (rear-naked choke)
|Legacy FC 30
|
|align=center|2
|align=center|4:01
|Albuquerque, New Mexico, United States
|
|-
|Win
|align=center|5–0
|Jeimeson Saudino
|Submission (rear-naked choke)
|SCS 20
|
|align=center|2
|align=center|4:22
|Hinton, Oklahoma, United States
|
|-
|Win
|align=center|4–0
|Angelo Sanchez
|Decision (unanimous)
|Triple A MMA 3: North vs. South
|
|align=center|3
|align=center|5:00
|Albuquerque, New Mexico, United States
|
|-
|Win
|align=center|3–0
|Lee Lindow
|TKO (punches)
|KOTC: World Championships
|
|align=center|1
|align=center|1:59
|Scottsdale, Arizona, United States
|
|-
|Win
|align=center|2–0
|Peter Baltimore
|Technical Submission (rear-naked choke)
|KOTC: Regulators
|
|align=center|1
|align=center|4:03
|Scottsdale, Arizona, United States
|
|-
|Win
|align=center|1–0
|Gene Perez
|Submission (rear-naked choke)
|KOTC: Ignite
|
|align=center|1
|align=center|3:01
|Santa Fe, New Mexico, United States
|
|-

See also
 List of current Bellator MMA fighters
 List of male mixed martial artists

References

External links
 
 

Living people
American male mixed martial artists
1993 births
Flyweight mixed martial artists
Mixed martial artists utilizing Gaidojutsu
Sportspeople from Albuquerque, New Mexico
Ultimate Fighting Championship male fighters